Júlio Regufe Alves  (born 29 June 1991) is a Portuguese professional footballer who plays as a midfielder.

Club career
Born in Póvoa de Varzim, Alves played youth football with three clubs, finishing his development with Rio Ave FC. In the 2010–11 season, he made his senior debut with farm team G.D. Ribeirão in the third division.

In late January 2011, Alves was recalled by his parent club, making his Primeira Liga debut on 6 February by playing the last five minutes – and nearly scoring from a free kick – of a 1–0 away loss against FC Porto, which he had previously represented as a youth. He contributed 239 minutes (three starts), as the Vila do Conde team retained their status.

Alves was bought by Spanish club Atlético Madrid in July 2011. However, the following month, in the last day of the summer transfer window, he moved teams – and countries – again, joining a host of compatriots at Beşiktaş JK, including manager Carlos Carvalhal.

On 24 August 2012, Alves signed for Sporting CP B on loan, playing the 2012–13 campaign in the Segunda Liga. On 16 April of the following year, his contract was terminated for €200,000.

Alves then returned to Rio Ave, but a registration error meant that neither he nor Ângelo Meneses could take part in Nuno Espírito Santo's team. In February 2016, in an interview to site Mais Futebol, he acknowledged that if his career was not better it was mainly due to personal problems and own mistakes.

Alves returned to football after five years of inactivity, agreeing to a deal at C.D. Cerveira of the Portuguese third tier.

International career
Alves represented Portugal at the 2011 FIFA U-20 World Cup, only missing one match in seven as the nation finished in second place in Colombia. His only appearance with the under-21s occurred on 5 September of that year, when he came on as a late substitute in the 1–0 friendly defeat of France in Rio Maior.

Personal life
Alves' older brothers, Bruno and Geraldo, were also footballers. He had paternal Brazilian ancestry, his father Washington Geraldo Dias Alves having played ten years of his career in Portugal – mainly with Varzim – where his children were born.

Their uncle, Geraldo Assoviador, also played the sport.

Honours
Portugal U20
FIFA U-20 World Cup runner-up: 2011

Orders
 Knight of the Order of Prince Henry

References

External links

1991 births
Living people
People from Póvoa de Varzim
Portuguese people of Brazilian descent
Sportspeople from Porto District
Portuguese footballers
Association football midfielders
Primeira Liga players
Liga Portugal 2 players
Segunda Divisão players
Rio Ave F.C. players
G.D. Ribeirão players
Sporting CP B players
Atlético Madrid footballers
Süper Lig players
Beşiktaş J.K. footballers
Portugal youth international footballers
Portugal under-21 international footballers
Portuguese expatriate footballers
Expatriate footballers in Spain
Expatriate footballers in Turkey
Portuguese expatriate sportspeople in Spain
Portuguese expatriate sportspeople in Turkey